Stella Mason (née Manuel; born c. 1901 – died April 30, 1918) was a Muscogee/Creek freedman, whose guardians and lawyers plundered her oil rich estate in Oklahoma. Her court case was published in newspapers and later was the subject of a publication. The exploitation was part of a pattern of abuse against freedmen among the Five Civilized Tribes. The plundering by lawyers and guardians continued after she died, through the estate of her 1-year-old son, Isaac Mason Jr. A grand jury was convened to investigate guardianship cases and recommended sanctions against various attorneys and a judge, including those involved in her case.

History 
Mason was orphaned in 1915. Her property was leased to Prairie Oil and Gas Company, a division of Standard Oil from 1900 to until 1911, when it was spun off after the Sherman Antitrust decision Standard Oil Co. of New Jersey v. United States. C. Benjamin Jefferson, "colored", was appointed as her guardian. She married Isaac Mason while still a minor at boarding school in Washington D.C. In 1916, she gave birth to their son. She filed for divorce from her husband around May 1917, stating she felt he married her for the money. 

Mason came of age and became entitled to her inheritance on May 21, 1917. At this time, her estate was valued at about $130,000 USD. Family members visited her with attorney Coody Johnson. Attorney and community leader A. G. W. Sango went to Washington D.C. and returned to Muskogee with her and her husband to retrieve her estate from her guardian. Lawyers Vilas K. Vernor and Ed K. Brooks arranged for her to sign a contract with them (after midnight) contracting them as her sole lawyer for $5,000 per year for five years paid in advance. County judge, Enloe Vassallo Vernor (1879–1944) was involved in investigations of her lawyers. He was himself later prosecuted.

Mason died on April 30, 1918, and she was buried at the Blackjack Cemetery (formally known as Taft Cemetery) in Muskogee, Oklahoma.

Zitkala-Sa co-authored Oklahoma's Poor Rich Indians: An Orgy of Graft and Exploitation of the Five Civilized Tribes, Legalized Robbery (1923) about Stella's experiences and similar abuses.

References

1918 deaths
Date of birth missing
Muscogee (Creek) Nation people
Native American people from Oklahoma
20th-century Native American women
20th-century Native Americans